Edible packaging refers to packaging which is edible and biodegradable.

Edible food packaging
Several manufacturers  are developing or producing food packaging that is edible.  One example is made based on the seaweed, Eucheuma cottonii.

Traditional water containers 
About 50 billion single-use plastic water bottles made of polyethylene terephthalate (PET) are produced in the United States each year, and most are discarded. According to the National Association for PET Container Resources, the recycling rate for PET has held steady at 31% since 2013.

Polyesters like PET can be broken down through hydrolytic degradation: the ester linkage is cut by a water molecule. The reaction proceeds differently in acidic or alkaline conditions, but works best at temperatures between 200 - 300 °C. Under environmental conditions the process is undetectably slow.

PET is considered to be essentially non-biodegradable, with plastic bottles estimated to take as long as 450 years to decompose. Because of this, other packaging materials are being sought.

Calcium alginate gel 

Alginates are the natural product of brown algae and have been used extensively in wound dressing, drug delivery and tissue engineering, as well as food applications. Sodium alginate is an unbranched copolymer of 1,4-linked-β-d-mannuronate (M) and α-l-guluronate (G) sugars.

Sodium alginate (NaAlg) coagulates when exposed to calcium chloride (CaCl2) and forms calcium alginate (CaAlg2) and sodium chloride (NaCl), according to the following reaction:

2NaAlg + CaCl2 → CaAlg2 + 2NaCl

Safety and biodegradability 
The biocompatibility of alginate gels has been studied extensively and their safety for consumption is well established. As natural polysaccharides resistant to breakdown by human digestive enzymes, alginates are classified as dietary fiber. Although undigested if eaten, an alginate capsule will gradually decompose as the calcium diffuses out of the gel matrix in the reverse of the reaction above.

CaAlg2   + 2NaCl  →  2NaAlg + CaCl2

Because it is a single-strand polymer, alginate can be depolymerized (broken into smaller units) by a variety of chemical reactions. Both acid and alkaline mechanisms can break down the linkages between the mannuronate (M) and guluronate (G) monomers.  Free radical oxidation is another way the alginate can be degraded in the environment. Many bacterial species produce an enzyme (alginate lyase) which can break the molecule down into single sugar components, which can act as an energy source for the organism.

See also 

 Biodegradation
 Calcium alginate
 Low plastic water bottle
 Molecular gastronomy
 Spherification
 Water bottle
 Starch-based foam peanuts
WikiCell

References 

Food packaging
Molecular gastronomy
2013 in the environment
2013 in London